Tai Dón, also known as Tai Khao or White Tai, is a Tai language of northern Vietnam, Laos and China.

Classification
Tai Dón is classified as belonging to the Tai-Kadai language group, located in the Tai languages and Southwestern Tai languages subgroups.

Geographical distribution
In China, White Tai (Tai Khaw 傣皓) people are located in the following townships of Yunnan province, with about 40,000 people (Gao 1999).

Jinping County 金平县: Mengla Township 勐拉乡 and Zhemi Township 者米乡 (along the banks of the Zhemi River 者米河 and Tengtiao River 藤条)
Malipo County 麻栗坡县: Nanwenhe Township 南温河乡
Maguan County 马关县: Dulong Town 都龙镇
Jiangcheng County 江城县: Qushui Township 曲水乡 (along the banks of the Tuka River 土卡河)

Phonology 
Each syllable has at least one onset, one nucleus, and one tone. The following sections present the consonants, vowels, and tones in Tai Dón.

Consonants

Initial consonants 

The following table presents the above consonant phonemes in words reported in Hudak's (2008) book.

There are four consonant clusters that occur at the beginning of a syllable.

Final consonants

Vowels 
Tai Dón has nine short vowels, and one long vowel. However, the short vowels are phonetically realized as long in final position (e.g., /e/ is phonetically [eː] in final position).

Tones 
There are six tones on a smooth syllable (an open syllable or a closed syllable ending in a sonorant).

Two of the six tones occur on a checked syllable (a syllable ending in a stop).

References

External links
 Preliminary proposal to encode the Tai Khao script in UCS
 A response to Kushim Jiang, “Preliminary proposal to encode the Tai Khao script in UCS”
 https://www.unicode.org/L2/L2022/22098-tai-don.pdf
 https://www.unicode.org/L2/L2022/22099-tai-don-comment.pdf

Languages of Vietnam
Southwestern Tai languages